Tricholoma argenteum is a mushroom of the agaric genus Tricholoma. It was described as new to science in 1989.

See also
List of North American Tricholoma
List of Tricholoma species

References

argenteum
Fungi described in 1989
Fungi of North America